Bhoot Aaya (Ghost has come) is an Indian drama documentary television series created by Akashdeep Sabir and directed by Ayush Raina for Sony Entertainment Television. Its central plot was based on paranormal experiences narrated by the real victims. Earlier the series was scheduled to telecast on 29 September 2013. But it was delayed, and the series premiered on 13 October 2013. The show was directed by Ayush Raina and was co-produced by Kaishav Arora. The series ended on 6 April 2014.

Plot
Bhoot Aaya attempted to explore the unexplained forces of the dark world and their encounters with humans. It is based on human brain psychology; whether the belief in ghosts is innate or not. The show depicted real life, spine chilling experiences of ordinary people. Each episode of Bhoot Aaya introduced Gaurav Tiwari and other experts from Indian Paranormal Society to explain the reasons behind such unexplained events.

Cast
 Karanvir Bohra
 Teejay Sendhu

Episode list

References

External links
Official website on SET India
Bhoot Aaya on SET Asia

2013 Indian television series debuts
Sony Entertainment Television original programming
Indian reality television series
Paranormal reality television series
2014 Indian television series endings